William Foster (December 27, 1813 Lenham, Kent, England – July 26, 1893 Syracuse, Onondaga County, New York) was an American politician from New York.

Life
He attended schools in Maidstone and Herstmonceux. In 1830, he emigrated to the United States, and became a clerk in a tannery near Oneida Lake. In 1837, he married Mary Cramp (1812–1883), and they had nine children. The couple removed to Ottawa, Illinois, and engaged in farming.

In 1839, he settled in Cleveland, New York and became again a bookkeeper in a tannery, and after the death of the owner, purchased the tannery. In 1851, he became a partner in the Union Glass Company which manufactured window glass. In 1867, he became a director of the New York and Oswego Midland Railroad.

He entered politics as a Whig, then became an Abolitionist, and joined the Republican Party upon its foundation. He was at times President of the Village of Cleveland; and Supervisor of the Town of Constantia. He was a member of the New York State Senate (21st D.) in 1872 and 1873.

He died at the home of his daughter Ellen (1838–1897) in Syracuse, and was buried at the Riverside Cemetery in Oswego.

Sources
 Life Sketches of Executive Officers and Members of the Legislature of the State of New York by William H. McElroy & Alexander McBride (1873; pg. 67f) [e-book]
 Bio transcribed from The Landmarks of Oswego County, NY (1895), at RootsWeb
 Extensive bio, at Rice University

1813 births
1893 deaths
Republican Party New York (state) state senators
People from Oswego County, New York
People from Lenham
19th-century American railroad executives
Town supervisors in New York (state)
19th-century American politicians